Angela Faye Kinsey (born June 25, 1971) is an American actress. She played Angela Martin in the sitcom The Office (2005–2013) and appeared in the sitcoms Your Family or Mine (2015) and Haters Back Off (2016–2017). Since The Office, Kinsey has appeared in Netflix's Tall Girl, Disney+'s Be Our Chef, A.P. Bio, and is currently a panelist on MTV's Deliciousness. She is a podcast co-host of Office Ladies.

Early years 
Kinsey was born in Lafayette, Louisiana. When she was two years old, her family moved to Jakarta, Indonesia, where her father worked as a drilling engineer. They lived there for 13 years, and she attended the Jakarta Intercultural School. During this time, she learned Indonesian, a language she still occasionally speaks. Her family returned to the United States and settled in Archer City, Texas.

Kinsey studied English at Baylor University, where she became a member of the Chi Omega sorority, "took as many theatre classes as possible", and participated in the "Baylor in London" program.

After graduating from Baylor in 1993, Kinsey served as an intern on the NBC talk show Late Night with Conan O'Brien, which she described as an "awesome" experience. She worked for the show's band leader, drummer Max Weinberg. The experience inspired Kinsey to take a coast-to-coast road trip with a friend from New York City to California.

Career 
Kinsey moved to Los Angeles and took improvisation classes with The Groundlings and at iO West (formerly known as "Improv Olympic West"). Following a two-woman show at iO, she was an operator at 1-800-Dentist and made small one-episode appearances in various sitcoms. She voiced the character "Angela" on two episodes of King of the Hill. In early 2005, she auditioned for the role of receptionist Pam Beesly for the American version of The Office. After producers told her she was "a little too feisty for Pam" she was called back to audition for the role of Angela Martin, which she won. She also appeared on Monk as a murderer named Arlene Boras in "Mr. Monk and the Naked Man" (2007) and "Mr. Monk's 100th Case" (2008).

In June 2007, Kinsey shared in the Daytime Emmy Award "Outstanding Broadband Program – Comedy", for her work on The Office: Accountants, which is a series of webisodes.

Kinsey is one of several cast members of The Office to have a role in License to Wed, a film directed by Ken Kwapis, who often directed episodes of The Office. Kinsey updated her MySpace blog with behind-the-scenes anecdotes of upcoming episodes of the series. She also took to organizing The Office cast outings: "I remember watching Friends and thinking, 'They really enjoy each other.' We, in fact, hang out."

In summer 2011, she became the new spokesperson for Clairol hair products, appearing in television ads for Clairol Nice 'n Easy. In 2013, she starred in New Girl. Since 2014, Kinsey has starred in the Hulu comedy series The Hotwives, returning for season two on August 18, 2015. That same year, she starred in the film All-Stars with Lance Kinsey (no relation).

Kinsey stars in the Netflix Original Series Haters Back Off as Bethany, the mother of the main character Miranda Sings. She appears alongside YouTube star Colleen Ballinger, as Miranda, and Steve Little, as Miranda's uncle Jim. While the first season was met with relatively mixed reviews, Kinsey received critical acclaim for her performance. In 2019, Kinsey starred in the Netflix film Tall Girl and plays the mom to Ava Michelle's main character Jodi.

In 2020, Kinsey appeared as the host of Disney+'s Be Our Chef  and as a panelist on MTV's Deliciousness.

On September 11, 2019, Kinsey announced via Twitter that she and Jenna Fischer would be co-hosting a weekly podcast called Office Ladies. According to Fischer's announcement, she and Kinsey "watch an episode of The Office and give you all the stories and behind-the-scenes scoop...as well as some BFF banter about our lives." The first episode of Office Ladies was released October 16, 2019. The podcast is still airing as of October 2022, with appearances from The Offices cast and crew. The podcast won Podcast of the Year at the iHeartRadio Podcast Awards 2021.

In 2021, Kinsey announced that she would be releasing a book, Office BFFs: Tales of The Office from Two Best Friends Who Were There, with former co-star Jenna Fischer, which was released in 2022.

Personal life 
On June 18, 2000, she married writer and producer Warren Lieberstein. He is the brother of Paul Lieberstein, who played Toby Flenderson on The Office. She gave birth to their daughter in May 2008. On February 18, 2009, Kinsey and her husband separated. Her representative stated that the two continue to be friends. In June 2010, it was announced that Kinsey had filed for divorce, citing "irreconcilable differences."

On August 4, 2016, Kinsey announced her engagement to her long-term boyfriend, actor and baker Joshua Snyder. On November 13, 2016, Kinsey married Snyder. Together, they have a YouTube channel and website called Baking with Josh & Ange.

Kinsey is Presbyterian. She has said her grandmother does not watch The Office because she feels the protagonist Michael Scott is too "vulgar." Kinsey said, "She'll say to me, 'Baby, we're so proud of you, I'm proud of you, but I do not care for the show and I do not watch it.

Kinsey supports Alley Cat Allies, a nonprofit advocacy organization dedicated to cats.

Filmography

Film

Television

Awards and nominations

References

External links 

PopGurls Interview: Angela Kinsey

1971 births
Actresses from Louisiana
Actresses from Texas
American film actresses
American Presbyterians
American television actresses
American women podcasters
American podcasters
Baylor University alumni
Daytime Emmy Award winners
Living people
People from Lafayette, Louisiana
20th-century American actresses
21st-century American actresses
People from Archer City, Texas